Roman Turek (born May 21, 1970) is a Czech former professional ice hockey goaltender who played for the Dallas Stars, St. Louis Blues and Calgary Flames in a nine-year National Hockey League (NHL) career. He last played in the Czech Extraliga for HC České Budějovice.

Playing career

Dallas Stars
Drafted 113th overall by the Minnesota North Stars in the 1990 NHL Entry Draft, Turek moved with the franchise to Dallas, where he initially played as the third-string goaltender behind Andy Moog and Artūrs Irbe before serving as the backup to Ed Belfour. He won a Stanley Cup in this role in 1999. Despite his backup role, he achieved international glory with the Czech Republic national team, backstopping them to a gold medal at the 1996 World Championships. In this year, he also played in Germany for the Nürnberg Ice Tigers.

St. Louis Blues
The Stars, fearing they would lose Turek to the Atlanta Thrashers in the upcoming expansion draft, traded him to the St. Louis Blues in the 1999 off-season, and Turek finally got his chance to shine as he topped the league with seven shutouts and won the William M. Jennings Trophy in his first season. He helped the Blues to the Presidents' Trophy that year and the Blues entered the playoffs with high expectations. However, St. Louis was eliminated in seven games by the eighth-seeded San Jose Sharks, with some aggravated Blues fans pinning responsibility on Turek because of some soft goals he allowed, including one in game 7 that was fired from centre ice by Sharks captain Owen Nolan. However, he played a second season with the Blues while being challenged for the starting position by backup Brent Johnson. He put up good numbers again, this time helping the Blues reach the playoffs as the fourth seed, where they again faced the Sharks in the first round. This time, Turek helped the Blues eliminate the Sharks in six games and then helped them sweep the Dallas Stars, his former team, in the second round. However, in the third round against the Colorado Avalanche, soft goals plagued him again (including one scored after an attempt to scoop the puck into his glove with his stick) and again in some fan circles bore the brunt of the blame for the Blues' third round 4–1 ouster.

Calgary Flames

In the off-season, Turek was traded to the Calgary Flames.

In the 2003–04 season, Turek's status as the Flames' starting goaltender was altered drastically when, following an injury to Turek, Darryl Sutter traded a conditional draft pick to the San Jose Sharks for Miikka Kiprusoff. Though he struggled in San Jose, Kiprusoff's stellar performances in Calgary relegated Turek to the bench. However, Turek was a dependable backup, as Kiprusoff led the Flames to the 2004 Stanley Cup Final against the Tampa Bay Lightning.

In 2004, Turek restructured his contract to substantially drop his salary from $5 million plus bonuses for the 2004–05 and 2005–06 seasons. The restructuring brought his salary to between $1 million and $2 million, with potential earnings relying heavily on performance bonuses. The restructuring saved the Calgary Flames organization between $3 million and $4 million in the 2004–05 season.

Turek announced his retirement from the NHL on August 9, 2005.

Mask design
 Turek's masks all featured Iron Maiden mascot "Eddie". The artwork was done by Ray Bishop of Bishop Custom Designs.

International play
 1994 Played for Czech Republic at 1994 Winter Olympics
 1994 Played for Czech Republic at World Championships
 1996 Won gold medal for Czech Republic at World Championships
 1996 Played for Czech Republic at World Cup of Hockey

Career statistics

Regular season and playoffs

International

Awards and honours

References

External links 
 

1970 births
Living people
People from Strakonice
Calgary Flames players
Czech ice hockey goaltenders
Czechoslovak ice hockey goaltenders
Dallas Stars players
Ice hockey players at the 1994 Winter Olympics
Minnesota North Stars draft picks
Motor České Budějovice players
National Hockey League All-Stars
Olympic ice hockey players of the Czech Republic
St. Louis Blues players
Stanley Cup champions
William M. Jennings Trophy winners
Sportspeople from the South Bohemian Region
Czech expatriate ice hockey players in the United States
Czech expatriate ice hockey players in Canada
Czech expatriate ice hockey players in Germany